Stirling Griff (born 2 December 1957) is an Australian former politician who was a Senator for South Australia from 2016 to 2022, representing the Nick Xenophon Team and Centre Alliance. His party changed its name from Nick Xenophon Team (NXT) led by Senator Nick Xenophon to Centre Alliance in April 2018 after Xenophon ceased to be connected with the party. He served as deputy leader of the party in the Senate until April 2018, when it adopted its current name. He was also the NXT spokesperson for health, immigration and communications. He was defeated at the 2022 federal election, having only secured 3% of the vote. His term expired on 30 June 2022.

Background
Griff was born and raised in South Australia. He is of Jewish Lithuanian descent. He has lived and worked in Adelaide, regional South Australia and Melbourne. He was married to Kristin (deceased 2021) and has four children aged 16 to 30 in 2016.

Griff has worked for the Bank of Adelaide, a radio network, Reader's Digest, Young & Rubicam, as a consultant, for the SA branch of the Retail Traders Association (later known as the Australian Retailers Association), and as a retail businessman in telecommunications, owning '3 Mobile' shops. Since 2013 he has been involved with Nick Xenophon, principally as his campaign manager in 2013.

Political career

2013 election and 2016 election

During the 2013 Federal Election campaign Griff was the campaign director for Nick Xenophon Group (as the party was then known). He also was instrumental in developing a computer programme that assisted the campaign. Griff was second on the NXG ticket behind Xenophon. Despite receiving more votes than the Labor Party, only Xenophon managed to win a senate seat. This was because of preference flows against NXG.

Following the establishment of the Nick Xenophon Team as a formal political party, Griff served as party secretary from 2013 to 2014 and party treasurer from 2014 to 2016.

In 2015, Griff was interviewed by Adelaide-based online newspaper, InDaily. The paper declared Griff "the power behind the Xenophon throne". In another article, Griff said he did not support ongoing assistance from the government towards the Australian automotive industry, saying "I stray a little bit with Nick [Xenophon] on this one". Griff also described how NXT was selecting candidates for the 2016 Election:

Australian Senate (2016–2022)

Griff was elected to the Australian Senate at the 2016 federal election, taking his place from September 2016. He was made Deputy Leader of Nick Xenophon Team in August 2016. In his first speech, Griff called for the public ownership of electricity, water, gas and broadband utilities.

He is reported to be a "strong advocate for emissions reductions".

Griff brokered an ACCC inquiry into digital platforms such as Facebook and Google as a condition of his former party supporting the Turnbull governments media reforms.

During his first term he supported same-sex marriage. He also provided support for a ban of "preferred" providers of medical and dental services, as well as the disclosure of doctors fees online by the government so that patients can better identify lower-cost services.

Griff supported the federal Territories Rights Euthanasia Bill stating he has "faith that none of us, no matter our upbringing or faith, desire to see people and particularly those close to us suffer a distressing death"

In June 2018, Griff attended the Rambam Israel Fellowship Program sponsored by the Australia/Israel and Jewish Affairs Council. The lobby group funded "transport, accommodation, meals and other associated costs".

He has a particular interest in health genomics and was the principal advocate for a national Genomic Cancer Medicine Program that will treat more than 5,000 patients nationally. Griff also brokered a deal with the Morrison federal government to secure funding for a $80m South Australian immunoGENomics Cancer Institute (SAiGEN) to complement the Australian Bragg Centre for Proton Therapy for which his party helped secure for SA in 2017.

Griff has a strong interest in preventing in-utero exposure to alcohol that is known to cause life-long developmental, physical, mental and behavioural problems and was successful in having the Senate undertake an inquiry into Fetal Alcohol Spectrum Disorder (FASD). He also successfully negotiated a $25m national awareness campaign for FASD.

Griff is a strong advocate for medical transparency, considering that "much of the medical industry operates like a secret society". The IVF industry has been a particular focus where he introduced a bill to ensure reporting of patient outcomes. This bill "spurred the IVF sector to finally start working towards disclosure of success rates for individual clinics".

Griff gave a speech to parliament in February 2020 calling for a motion to ban anime and manga depicting "child exploitation"

Griff launched the YourIVFSuccess.com.au website in February 2021 after working with the IVF industry for 18 months. The site features a predictor tool and online search capability showing success rates for the majority of IVF clinics in Australia.

Griff introduced a Transparent Patient Outcomes bill into federal parliament in December 2021 that would "empower patients" to make informed decisions on their surgeons before going under the knife. The bill will show the number and type of procedures performed by each surgeon, their mortality and surgical revision rates and other information.

Griff successfully advocated for federal funding to establish an innovative cancer genomics laboratory in South Australia. The Federal Health Minister Greg Hunt acknowledged Senator Griff "for his strong advocacy for this cancer genomics laboratory and his tireless advocacy for cancer research nationally and in South Australia" 

Griff ended his parliamentary career at the federal election 21 May 2022 "in the understated fashion that has become synonymous with his many victories as a powerful crossbencher"

"During his six years in parliament, Senator Griff has quietly used the balance of power to secure hundreds of millions of dollars in government investments for SA that would have otherwise gone begging. These include $68m for the Southern Hemisphere's first Proton Therapy Centre and an extra $424m in Gonski 2.0 school funding.

He also helped the media industry by instigating the ACCC Digital Platforms inquiry that brought tech giants Google and Facebook into line."

References

Jewish Australian politicians
1957 births
Living people
Members of the Australian Senate for South Australia
Nick Xenophon Team members of the Parliament of Australia
21st-century Australian politicians